Francesc Masriera i Manovens (21 October 1842, Barcelona — 15 March 1902, Barcelona) was a Spanish figure painter and goldsmith who was influenced by Orientalism.

Biography

He was born into a family of painters, set designers and silversmiths and began his artistic training in his father's workshop. When he was only thirteen, he went to Geneva to learn the techniques for painting on enamel.

He opened his first studio in 1871 and participated in the "Exposició General Catalana". The following year, he returned to Paris alone and established contact with Goupil & cie, one of the most important art dealerships at that time. He was awarded second prize at the National Exhibition of Fine Arts in 1878 with his painting "La esclava" (The Slave), which was later purchased by King Alfonso XII. In 1889, he was awarded a medal at the Exposition Universelle. For most of his life, he was active in the family jewelry business, Masriera y Hijos (later, Hermanos Masrieras).

Between 1882 and 1884, he and Josep built an elaborate workshop on Bailen Street, modeled after the ancient Temple of Augustus on Mont Tàber. It was designed by Josep Vilaseca i Casanovas. Flanking the entrance were statues of Eduardo Rosales and Marià Fortuny, created by Josep Reynés. The Masriera's combined art collections were kept there and it became a major cultural center, featuring dramatic performances as well as art shows. In 1932, it became the Teatre Studium and was later connected to the adjoining buildings. It is now a residence for the nuns of the "Petita Companyia del Cor Eucarístic de Jesús".

As a jeweler, he was well known for his use of Plique-à-jour, a notoriously difficult technique. He was also an amateur playwright and a regular contributor to a weekly "magazine", El Recuerdo, created by his brother Josep and his friends, but never actually published.

Selected paintings

See also
 List of Orientalist artists
 Orientalism

References

Further reading 
"Francesc Masriera el pintor de la riquessa", Butlletí dels Museus d´Art de Barcelona, November 1932.
 Francesc Quílez i Corella, Els Masriera, Barcelona, Generalitat de Catalunya, Departament de Cultura, 1996.

External links 

 ArtNet: more works by Masriera

1842 births
1902 deaths
19th-century Spanish painters
19th-century male artists
Spanish male painters
Painters from Catalonia
Spanish goldsmiths
Orientalism
Orientalist painters
Painters from Barcelona